The 2006 Baden-Württemberg state election was held on 26 March 2006 to elect the members of the 13th Landtag of Baden-Württemberg. The incumbent coalition government of the Christian Democratic Union (CDU) and Free Democratic Party (FDP) led by Minister-President Günther Oettinger was re-elected with an increased majority and continued in office.

Parties
The table below lists parties represented in the previous Landtag of Baden-Württemberg.

Opinion polling

Results

|-
|colspan="8" | 
|-
! colspan="2" | Party
! Votes
! %
! +/-
! Seats 
! +/-
! Seats %
|-
| bgcolor=| 
| align=left | Christian Democratic Union (CDU)
| align=right| 1,748,781
| align=right| 44.2
| align=right| 0.6
| align=right| 69
| align=right| 6
| align=right| 49.7
|-
| bgcolor=| 
| align=left | Social Democratic Party (SPD)
| align=right| 996,095
| align=right| 25.2
| align=right| 8.1
| align=right| 38
| align=right| 7
| align=right| 27.3
|-
| bgcolor=| 
| align=left | Alliance 90/The Greens (Grüne)
| align=right| 462,889
| align=right| 11.7
| align=right| 4.0
| align=right| 17
| align=right| 7
| align=right| 12.2
|-
| bgcolor=| 
| align=left | Free Democratic Party (FDP)
| align=right| 421,885
| align=right| 10.7
| align=right| 2.6
| align=right| 15
| align=right| 5
| align=right| 10.8
|-
! colspan=8|
|-
| bgcolor=#FF8000| 
| align=left | Labour and Social Justice – The Electoral Alternative (WASG)
| align=right| 121,875
| align=right| 3.1
| align=right| New
| align=right| 0
| align=right| New
| align=right| 0
|-
| bgcolor=| 
| align=left | The Republicans (REP)
| align=right| 100,079
| align=right| 2.5
| align=right| 1.9
| align=right| 0
| align=right| ±0
| align=right| 0
|-
| bgcolor=|
| align=left | Others
| align=right| 108,741
| align=right| 2.6
| align=right| 0.0
| align=right| 0
| align=right| ±0
| align=right| 0
|-
! align=right colspan=2| Total
! align=right| 3,960,345
! align=right| 100.0
! align=right| 
! align=right| 139
! align=right| 11
! align=right| 
|-
! align=right colspan=2| Voter turnout
! align=right| 
! align=right| 53.4
! align=right| 9.2
! align=right| 
! align=right| 
! align=right| 
|}

References
 Baden-Wuerttemberg Interior Ministry

2006 elections in Germany
2006